Aboubacar Leo Camara (born 1 January 1993) is a Guinean international footballer who last played as a defender for  club Ansar.

International career
His last international match for Guinea national football team occurred on February 7, 2016 in which he scored one goal against Ivory Coast national football team.

Career statistics

International goals
Scores and results list Guinea's goal tally first.

Honours

Club 
Ansar
 Lebanese Premier League runner up: 2018–19
 Lebanese FA Cup runner-up: 2018–19
 Lebanese Super Cup runner-up: 2017

References

External links
 
 
 

1993 births
Living people
Guinean footballers
Guinea international footballers
Association football fullbacks
Satellite FC players
Hafia FC players
AS Kaloum Star players
PS TIRA players
Al Ansar FC players
Guinean expatriate footballers
Expatriate footballers in Indonesia
Guinean expatriate sportspeople in Indonesia
Expatriate footballers in Lebanon
Guinean expatriate sportspeople in Lebanon
Lebanese Premier League players
Guinea A' international footballers
2016 African Nations Championship players